Robert Sayre may refer to:
Robert Sayre, involved in Atom (standard)#Atom 1.0 and IETF standardization
Robert H. Sayre, eponymous namesake of Sayre, Pennsylvania, once the chief engineer of the Lehigh Coal & Navigation Company, later hired as the Chief Engineer and Superintendent of the Lehigh Valley Railroad from its survey in 1846 onwards. 
Robert M. Sayre, American diplomat